Jacques Arnoux (7 April 1938 – 8 August 2019) was a French racewalker. He competed in the men's 50 kilometres walk at the 1960 Summer Olympics.

References

1938 births
2019 deaths
Athletes (track and field) at the 1960 Summer Olympics
French male racewalkers
Olympic athletes of France
Place of birth missing